Orrefors Glassworks (also known as just Orrefors) is a glassworks in the Swedish village Orrefors in Småland. Orrefors manufactured crystal glassware and art glass. The range consisted of crystal stemware, barware, vases, and sculptures and lighting products in crystal. The glassworks in Orrefors closed in 2012.

Orrefors was a part of the Swedish glassworks group Orrefors Kosta Boda AB.

History

The Orrefors glassworks were founded in 1898 on the site of an older iron works. Up until 1913, the company produced mainly window glass and bottles. When Consul Johan Ekman bought the factory in 1913, Orrefors started to produce drinking glasses, vases and other house-ware items. Ekman hired the brothers Eugen and Knut Bergkvist, who had worked at Kosta Boda before, as well as Fritz Blomqvist and Heinrich Wollman. Wollman originated from Bohemia, which had a long tradition in glassmaking. The first attempts at art glass making were in the style of the at the time famous French glassworks such Daum and Gallé.

A similar technique was devised in 1936 which trapped air within the walls of the glass. This was known as Ariel, a name of a character in Shakespeare's play The Tempest. A major influence of theirs was the Art Nouveau work of the French artist Émile Gallé. Their designs use characteristic clean lines of brilliant crystal that suggests a frozen liquid. Their work was greatly admired when it was displayed to a wide audience at the Paris Exhibition of 1925.

In addition to individual pieces of crystal, the company made crystal stemware. The glass house came to be a leading producer during the interwar period. In more recent times the factory has also become noted for its chandelier-making. Many of the older designs were still produced in the 21st century.

Since 2013, the building has been home to the "Per Ekström Museet", an art museum.

Notable works
 The Apple Sculpture (1955 by Ingeborg Lundin)
 Bowl (Simon Gate)

Designers at Orrefors

 Knut Bergqvist 1914-1929
 Heinrich Wollman 1914-1923
 Gustav Abels 1915-1959
 Eva Jancke-Björk 1915-1917 
 Fritz Blomqvist 1915-1917
 Simon Gate 1916-1945
 Edward Hald 1917-1978 
 Nils Landberg 1927-1972
 John Selbing 1927-1973
 Vicke Lindstrand 1928-1940 
 Sven Palmqvist 1928-1971 
 Flory Gate 1930
 Edvin Öhrström 1936-1958
 Fritz Kurz 1940-1946
 Carl Fagerlund 1946-1980
 Ingeborg Lundin 1947-1971
 Gunnar Cyrén 1959-1970, 1976-
 Jan Johansson 1969-
 Börge Lindau 1970-
 Bo Lindekrantz 1970- 
 Peter Mandl 1970-
 Styrbjörn Engström 1970
 Olle Alberius 1971-1973
 Henning Koppel 1971-1981
 Rolf Nilsson 1971-1972
 Lars Hellsten 1972-
 Eva Englund 1974-1990 
 Wiktor Bernt 1975-1979
 Owe Elven 1975-1978
 Berit Johansson 1979-1983
 Arne Branzell 1980-1982
 Anette Krahner 1980-1981
 Erika Lagerbielke 1982-
 Anne Nilsson 1982-2005
 Klas-Göran Tinbäck 1982-1983
 Mats Borgström 1984-1990
 Helén Krantz 1988-2005
 Vivianne Karlsson 1989-1993
 Lena Bergström 1994-
 Per B Sundberg 1994-
 Martti Rytkönen 1994-
 Ingegerd Råman 1999-
 Karl Lagerfeld 2010-2019

References

External links
 Official Orrefors website

Glassmaking companies of Sweden
Design companies established in 1898
Manufacturing companies established in 1898
Swedish companies established in 1898
Art Nouveau
Värend